Richard Hu Tsu Tau (born 30 October 1926) is a Singaporean retired politician who served as Minister for Finance between 1985 and 2001. A member of the governing People's Action Party (PAP), he was the Member of Parliament (MP) for Kreta Ayer SMC between 1984 and 1997 and Kreta Ayer–Tanglin GRC between 1997 and 2001.

Early life
Hu was born in Singapore from Hu Tsai Kuen, a doctor, and Margaret Kwan Fu Shing. He was educated at the Anglo-Chinese School before graduating from the University of California, Berkeley in 1952 with a Bachelor of Science degree in chemistry. He subsequently went on to complete a PhD in chemical engineering at the University of Birmingham.

Career
Hu joined the Royal Dutch Shell Group of Companies in 1960 and rose to the position of Chairman and Chief Executive of this global company in Singapore between 1977 and 1983.

In 1983, Hu became the Managing Director of the Monetary Authority of Singapore (MAS) and the Government of Singapore Investment Corporation (GIC), holding both posts concurrently until 1984. He was chairman of Monetary Authority of Singapore from 1985 to 1997.

Hu contested as a People's Action Party candidate in the Kreta Ayer Single Member Constituency in 1984 General Elections and won the election. Following the elections, he became the Minister for Health for two years from 1985 to 1987 and the Minister of Finance for 16 years from 1985 to 2001. He had also briefly served as Minister for National Development from 1992 till 1993.  As the Minister for Finance, Hu is perhaps best known by his signature on the 'Ship' series of legal tender notes issued after his appointment. He also introduced the Goods and Services Tax in 1993. As part of deregulation and reform of its financial and banking sectors, Hu oversaw the privatization of the government-run Post Office Savings Bank (POSB) and the sale of POSB to the Development Bank of Singapore (DBS) in 1998.

On 13 April 2004, Hu joined the Board of Singaporean property development company CapitaLand and was elected Chairman the same day, until his retirement in 2012. He was also the Chairman of GIC Real Estate Pte Ltd and Asia Financial Holdings Pte Ltd, as well as a Director of the Government of Singapore Investment Corporation (GIC) and a Director of Buildfolio.Com.Inc. Hu also served as the Chancellor of the Singapore Management University from July 2002 to August 2010.

Hu retired from GIC in 2012.

In 2013, Hu was appointed as senior advisor of the Fraser and Neave board.

Personal life
Hu is married to Irene Tan Dee Leng. They have two children. He is of Hakka Chinese ancestry.

References

External links
AIMR Conference Proceedings May 1996, Volume 1996 Issue 5

Members of the Cabinet of Singapore
Members of the Parliament of Singapore
Finance ministers of Singapore
Chairmen of the Monetary Authority of Singapore
People's Action Party politicians
Singaporean people of Hakka descent
People from Yongding District, Longyan
Singaporean politicians of Chinese descent
Anglo-Chinese School alumni
1926 births
Living people
Alumni of the University of Birmingham
Ministers for Health of Singapore